Károly Nemes (also Dragan/Dragutin Nemeš) was a Hungarian football goalkeeper and coach.  He is best known for his work on champion teams of SK Rapid Wien and SK Jugoslavija. He coached throughout Central and South-Eastern Europe.

Career

Player
He played with Wiener Sport-Club and next MTK Budapest and then became the first foreigner to play in SK Rapid Wien.  He played two seasons with Rapid, between 1917 and 1919, and, after serving as vice-champion in 1917–18. A year later he won the double, the 1918–19 Austrian football championship and the 1919 Austrian Cup.  He played a total of 27 league matches for Rapid.

In 1919 he moved to Yugoslavia, then the Kingdom of Serbs, Croats and Slovenes, where he continued his career.  Initially he joined NAK Novi Sad and later was brought to Belgrade to join SK Jugoslavija and win the Yugoslav Championship two times in a row, in 1924 and 1925.  He made 6 appearances in those two seasons in the Yugoslav championship and many more in the First League of the Belgrade Football Subassociation. While in Yugoslavia he became commonly known either as Karlo or Dragutin Nemeš.

Coach
Nemes coaching abilities were characterised as of the avant-garde Central European school, noted for his psychological preparation of the team before matches, beside a developed work in the physical condition of the players.

In 1927 he was brought by FK Vojvodina president Kosta Hadži to Novi Sad where he first coached, briefly replacing main coach Otto Necas. He was the coach of the Bulgarian national team in 1930. Between Summer 1930 and September 1931 he coached Swiss side FC Luzern. He had a second coaching spell with Vojvodina in 1932, staying for almost two years.  He returned in 1939. 

He coached his former team SK Jugoslavija in 1934. Then he coached NAK Novi Sad winning with them the Novi Sad Football Subassociation League and a third place in the 1935–36 Yugoslav Football Championship. He coached in Germany, Switzerland and Bulgaria.  During the 1930s he coached Cibalia Vinkovci. He took charge of SK Bata Borovo coming from SK Jugoslavia, in July 1938, replacing Bilek. 

In the early 1940s he returned to Yugoslavia and coached SK Bata Borovo in the 1940–41 Serbian League.

He later moved to Hungary and lived in Jánoshalma.

Honours
As player:

Rapid Wien
Austrian Championship: 1918–19
Austrian Cup: 1919

SK Jugoslavija
Yugoslav Championship: 1924 and 1925

As coach:

NAK Novi Sad
Novi Sad Subassociation League: 1934

Vojvodina
Novi Sad Subassociation League: 1939

References

Hungarian footballers
Association football goalkeepers
MTK Budapest FC players
SK Rapid Wien players
Expatriate footballers in Austria
NAK Novi Sad players
SK Jugoslavija players
Yugoslav First League players
Expatriate footballers in Yugoslavia
Hungarian football managers
Hungarian expatriate football managers
FC Luzern managers
FK Vojvodina managers
SK Jugoslavija managers
HNK Cibalia managers
HNK Borovo managers
Bulgaria national football team managers
Hungarian expatriate sportspeople in Austria
Hungarian expatriate sportspeople in Yugoslavia
Expatriate football managers in Yugoslavia
Expatriate football managers in Switzerland